Klubi 04 is a Finnish football club based in Helsinki. It is the reserve team of HJK Helsinki for whom a number of the players are also registered.

History
Klubi 04 was founded in 2004 when HJK bought FC Jokerit. Initially Klubi 04 played in Kakkonen, the third highest league level in Finland. Klubi 04 was promoted to Ykkönen in 2006 when it beat FC Inter's reserve team VG-62. Klubi's former head coach is Abdou Talat, he finished with Klubi 04 the sixth place in 2006 its first season in Ykkönen.

Season 2007 Klubi 04:n finished in Ykkönen 14th. The team was relegated to Kakkonen for Season 2008.
For season 2008 the team was altered for the most parts, and the new head coach was Juho Rantala. The young team was promoted
back to Ykkönen by securing the place two rounds before season end. During Season 2009 the team secured its place in
Ykkönen three rounds before season end, and they finished at 8th place.

For Season 2010 Klubi 04 received new head coach with Pasi Rasimus.

Current squad

Management
As of 30th March 2022

Former coaches
 Abdou Talat
 Juho Rantala
 Toni Koskela

References

External links

 

Football clubs in Finland
Helsingin Jalkapalloklubi
2004 establishments in Finland